Oxbow Dam is a hydroelectric run-of-the-river rockfill dam in the western United States, on the Snake River in Hells Canyon (river mile 273) along the Idaho-Oregon border. Completed  in 1961, it is part of the Hells Canyon Project that also includes Hells Canyon Dam and Brownlee Dam, all built and operated by Idaho Power Company.

Lacking passage for migrating salmon, the three Hells Canyon Project dams blocked access by anadromous salmonids to a stretch of the Snake River drainage basin from Hells Canyon Dam up to Shoshone Falls, which naturally prevents any upstream fish passage to the upper Snake River basin.

Heliport
Oxbow Heliport  is a private , turf heliport owned by Idaho Power.

See also

Copperfield, Oregon
Oxbow, Oregon
List of dams in the Columbia River watershed

Notes

References
 Oxbow Dam, Columbia Basin Research
 Oxbow Dam, Northwest Power and Conservation Council
 Oxbow Dam, Idaho Power

External links

Dams completed in 1961
Buildings and structures in Adams County, Idaho
Buildings and structures in Baker County, Oregon
Dams in Idaho
Dams in Oregon
Idaho Power dams
Dams on the Snake River
Rock-filled dams
1961 establishments in Idaho
1961 establishments in Oregon